is the 4th single by Japanese idol group Hinatazaka46. It was released on February 19, 2020 through Sony Music Entertainment Japan. The title track featured Nao Kosaka as center, marking her fourth consecutive appearance at this position. The members competed against each other in a Daifugō tournament for the CD's bonus content.

Release 
The single was released in four versions: Type-A, Type-B, Type-C and a regular edition.

The songs "Seishun no Uma" and "Naze" are used in the opening and closing theme, respectively, of the television show Dasada, which casts all members of Hinatazaka46. "Seishun no Uma" was debuted unusually early before the title track on January 11, where it was performed live at an Tokyo Girls Collection event in Shizuoka.

Reception 

Songwriter Junji Ishiwatari positively commented on the expressions used in the lyrics to describe the singer's love interest, such as comparing her bangs to the art style of Yoshitomo Nara.

Track listing 
All lyrics written by Yasushi Akimoto.

Type-A

Type-B

Type-C

Regular Edition

Participating members

"Sonna Koto Nai yo" 
Center: Nao Kosaka

 1st row: Kyōko Saitō, Miku Kanemura, Nao Kosaka, Mei Higashimura, Shiho Katō
 2nd row: Sarina Ushio, Miho Watanabe, Akari Nibu, Hina Kawata, Konoka Matsuda, Suzuka Tomita
 3rd row: Kumi Sasaki, Hiyori Hamagishi, Ayaka Takamoto, Hinano Kamimura, Mana Takase, Manamo Miyata, Mirei Sasaki

"Seishun no Uma" 
Center: Nao Kosaka

Sarina Ushio, Shiho Katō, Kyōko Saitō, Kumi Sasaki, Mirei Sasaki, Mana Takase, Ayaka Takamoto, Mei Higashimura, Miku Kanemura, Hina Kawata, Nao Kosaka, Suzuka Tomita, Akari Nibu, Hiyori Hamagishi, Konoka Matsuda, Manamo Miyata, Miho Watanabe, Hinano Kamimura

"Suki to Iu Koto wa…" 
Center: Mirei Sasaki

Sarina Ushio, Shiho Katō, Kyōko Saitō, Kumi Sasaki, Mirei Sasaki, Mana Takase, Ayaka Takamoto, Mei Higashimura

"Mado o Akenakute mo" 
Shiho Katō, Kyōko Saitō, Kumi Sasaki, Mirei Sasaki, Nao Kosaka, Suzuka Tomita, Miho Watanabe

"Naze-" 
Mei Higashimura, Hina Kawata, Konoka Matsuda

"Kimi no Tame Nani ga Dekiru Darō" 
Center: Akari Nibu

Miku Kanemura, Hina Kawata, Nao Kosaka, Suzuka Tomita, Akari Nibu, Hiyori Hamagishi, Konoka Matsuda, Manamo Miyata, Miho Watanabe, Hinano Kamimura

Charts

Weekly charts

Year-end charts

References 

2020 singles
2020 songs
Hinatazaka46 songs
Songs with lyrics by Yasushi Akimoto
Sony Music Entertainment Japan singles
Oricon Weekly number-one singles
Billboard Japan Hot 100 number-one singles